Heni Materoa Sunderland  (née Brown; 13 October 1916 – 15 July 2008), affectionately known as Nanny Heni, was a Māori kaumātua (community leader) in New Zealand. She stood up for women's rights in her community and she represented her community in establishing their rights.

Life
Sunderland was born in Manutuke in Poverty Bay in 1916 to Erena Te Ahuahu Maynard and Eruera Brown. She was brought up by her grandparents. The Maori were oppressed as most of their land had been taken and an epidemic in 1913 had attacked their community. She was living with "squatters". She was taught Maori and later English and became bilingual.

She married James "Jim" Brown in 1955 at Toko Toru Tapu Church. They had a son named Michael and she regretted that she did not teach him Maori as her own ability in two languages meant that she could operate in two different cultures.

She was involved in standing up for women's rights when the local men declared that only men would be allowed to speak at the sacred place or marae in Manutuke because they had installed a paepae. Heni remembered that this was an inequality that her grandmothers had not seen. She did not accept the new rules and continued to talk as an equal.

In the 1991 New Year Honours, Sunderland was awarded the Queen's Service Medal for community service. Her knowledge of Maori traditions meant that she was extensively consulted by authors writing books about their culture.

Sunderland died in July 2008. The following year she was awarded a posthumous honorary doctorate by the University of Waikato.

References

1916 births
2008 deaths
People from Manutuke
Māori activists
Recipients of the Queen's Service Medal